Edna Park Edwards (c. 1895–1967) was an American screen actress.

Life
Edna Park was born in Pittsburgh, Pennsylvania. She was a vaudeville dancer as a child, performing alongside her mother. In her teens she performed with several dramatic stock companies. She married Jack Edwards, another actor. They formed their own company, the Edna Park Players, playing in the American South, in New York, and in San Francisco.

She became a leading lady for Tom Mix. After retiring from the screen she wrote for radio. She died in Hollywood, Los Angeles on June 5, 1967. She was survived by a daughter and two sons, including the actor Sam Edwards.

References

1890s births
1967 deaths
Actresses from Pittsburgh
Vaudeville performers
American film actresses
20th-century American actresses
American radio writers
Women radio writers